2012 Fatehpur Violence refers to the attack on the minority Hindu community in the Fatehpur village under Kaliganj upazila in Satkhira District in south-western Bangladesh on the 31 March 2012.

Background 
On 26 March 2012, on the occasion of the Independence Day the students of Fatehpur High School staged a play adapted from the short story 'Huzur Kebla' by eminent Bangladeshi politician and litterateur Abul Mansur Ahmed. The text is included in the  syllabus of Bengali in the university degree courses. Three days later, on 29 March 2012, Dainik Drishtipat and Dainik Alor Parash, two Jamaat-e-Islami supported local newspapers reported that blasphemous remarks about the Islamic prophet, Muhammad, were made in the drama. Though the news was proved to be false later on, tensions began to mount once the news spread.

On 30 March, South Sripur Union Parishad member Abu Jafar Sanpui filed a case with Kaliganj police station accusing a dramatist, a headmaster and an assistant headmaster. Police arrested the headmaster and the assistant teacher and send them to jail.

A group of Muslims and mullahs held noisy demonstrations after Jumma prayers on Friday, blocking roads for hours.

Attacks 
On Saturday, people from neighbouring areas began to gather in Fatehpur village under the banner of Touhidi Janata. Hundreds of people from Krishnanagar and Bishnupur unions and other areas assembled outside the Fatehpur village of South Sripur union. At around 9a.m. they attacked the Fatehpur High School and Fatehpur Government Primary School with sticks, iron rods and machetes. Then they attacked the houses of Shahinur Rahman and his three brothers and set them on fire. In the Banshtala market, they set fire to the shop of Abdul Hakim Sardar, a member of the administrative committee of Fatehpur High School. Then as the sun set the Muslims burnt down the house of 7 Hindu families including Mita Rani Hazra. They also robbed valuable things from those houses.

On Sunday afternoon, rumour spread that Lalita Sardar, a Hindu housewife from Chakdaha village had made another blasphemous remark about Muhammad. People began to gather in the Sardar residence. In the evening, Firoz Kabir Kajal, the president of Nazimganj Bazar Committee arrived at their house along local Union Parishad members. They began to pressurize Lalita to publicly apologize for her blasphemous remarks. During this meeting about two hundred youths from nearby villages gathered near their house and threatened to kick the family and send them to India. At around 7pm thousands of teenagers and youths were called to the spot from the different villages of Kaliganj Upazila. The outsiders gathered around the houses of the minority Hindus and began to pelt stones and brick bats in their houses.  The Hindu men, women and children fearing for their lives, began to run towards safety.  The attackers then broke open their houses and looted their valuables, including jewelry, garments, land deeds and other valuable documents. They also snatched the jewelry box from Lalita Sardar. After securing the loot in safe havens, the miscreants doused the houses in petrol and set them on fire. The houses of 10 Hindu families were looted and set on fire. The loot and arson took place in the presence of the police. The fire brigade was blocked from entering into the area until the houses were completely burnt. The District Magistrate, District Superintendent of Police, the Additional D.I.G. (Khulna Range) and RAB officers arrived at night and tried to bring things under control.

From the beginning, a social media managed by a local awareness group named HomeSatkhira Community took a stand for the victims of the Fatehpur tragedy. Under the leadership of S M Saifur Rahman, they took a strong stand against the fundamentalist miscreants by attracting the attention of the conscious circles of the country and abroad. They formed mass movements online and offline to protect the lives of the minority Hindu community and came forward with their support. Following this, the fundamentalist group started threatening S M Saifur Rahman and his companions. They threatened to kill their lives and burn their houses.

Aftermath 
A week after the attacks, the majority of the Hindu victims still remained terrorized. Members of many of the families haven't returned to their houses.

On Wednesday, 11 April 2012 District Commissioner of Satkhira District canceled declaration of the daily drishtipat because of provocating the attack on Hindu families and failure to answer show cause order of the High Court.

Protests 
Mainstream Bangladeshi media completely maintained a silence over this incident. Then as the Hindu Students of Jagannath Hall of Dhaka University protested against the persecution. Bangladeshi media highlighted this event. Students of Dhaka University Jagannath Hall staged demonstrations putting up barricades on Shahbag-Matsya Bhaban road on Thursday, 5 April 2012 morning.
Nearly 500 students brought out a procession from their dormitory in the morning and later took position at Shahbagh around 10:30am.
They demanded tougher actions against the people responsible for the incident.
Earlier, on Wednesday night, the students blocked Elephant-Matsya Bhaban road for an hour on the same issue. Bangladesh Hindu Mohajot also protested against the incident.

See also
 1962 Rajshahi massacres
 1964 East-Pakistan riots
 1971 Bangladesh genocide
 Operation Searchlight
 Chuknagar massacre
 Jathibhanga massacre
 Shankharipara massacre
 Razakar 
 1989 Bangladesh pogroms
 1990 Bangladesh anti-Hindu violence
 1992 Bangladesh violence
 2012 Chirirbandar violence
 2012 Hathazari violence
 2012 Ramu violence
 2013 Bangladesh Anti-Hindu violence
 2014 Bangladesh anti-Hindu violence
 Noakhali riots 
 Persecution of indigenous peoples in Bangladesh
 Persecution of Hindus in Bangladesh
 Persecution of Buddhists in Bangladesh
 Persecution of Chakma buddhists
 Persecution of Ahmadis in Bangladesh
 Persecution of Christians in Bangladesh
 Persecution of atheists and secularists in Bangladesh
 Freedom of religion in Bangladesh
 Human rights in Bangladesh

References 

Satkhira District
2012 crimes in Bangladesh
Anti-Hindu violence in Bangladesh
21st-century Hinduism
March 2012 events in Bangladesh